Red Hat Gluster Storage, formerly Red Hat Storage Server, is a computer storage product from Red Hat. It is based on open source technologies such as GlusterFS and Red Hat Enterprise Linux.

The latest release, RHGS 3.5, combines Red Hat Enterprise Linux (RHEL 8 and also RHEL 7) with the latest GlusterFS community release, oVirt, and XFS File System.

In April 2014, Red Hat re-branded GlusterFS-based Red Hat Storage Server to "Red Hat Gluster Storage".

Description
Red Hat Gluster Storage, a scale-out NAS product, uses as its basis GlusterFS, a distributed file-system. Red Hat Gluster Storage also exemplifies software-defined storage (SDS).

History
In June 2012, Red Hat Gluster Storage was announced as a commercially supported integration of GlusterFS with Red Hat Enterprise Linux.

Releases
 3.5
 3.4
 3.3 Release Notes
 3.2
 3.1
 3.0
 2.1

References

Distributed data storage
Distributed file systems
Distributed file systems supported by the Linux kernel
Network file systems
Red Hat software
Software using the GPL license
Userspace file systems
Virtualization software for Linux